Nahda College  is an educational institution founded in 2014 and based in the city of Khartoum, Sudan.

External links
Official website

2014 establishments in Sudan
Education in Khartoum
Educational institutions established in 2014
Universities and colleges in Sudan